A gorge or canyon is a deep cleft resulting from weathering and the erosive activity of rivers.

Gorge may also refer to:
 Gorge (mythology), a figure from Greek mythology
 Gorge FC, an American amateur soccer team
 Gorge Trio, an American experimental rock band
 Gorge walking or canyoning
 Gorge (fishing hook)
 Gorge (fortification), the interior or rear part of a fort

See also
 Canyon (disambiguation)
 Canon (disambiguation)
 The Gorge (disambiguation)
 Gorges (disambiguation)
 List of gorges
 Royal Gorge (disambiguation)